The Metro Manila Film Festival Award for Best Cinematography is an award presented annually by the Metropolitan Manila Development Authority (MMDA). It was first awarded at the 1st Metro Manila Film Festival ceremony, held in 1975; Nonong Rasca received the award for his cinematography in Kapitan Kulas and it is given to a cinematographer for work in one particular motion picture. Currently, nominees and winners are determined by Executive Committees, headed by the Metropolitan Manila Development Authority Chairman and key members of the film industry.

Winners and nominees

1970s

1980s

1990s

2000s

2010s

2020s

Multiple awards for Best Cinematography
Throughout the history of Metro Manila Film Festival (MMFF), there have been cinematographers who received multiple Awards for Best Cinematography. As of 2015 (41st MMFF), 6 cinematographers have received two or more Best Cinematography awards.

Notes

References

External links
IMDB: Metro Manila Film Festival
Official website of the Metro Manila Film Festival

Cinematography
Awards for best cinematography